Climate Change Capital was a private asset management and advisory group founded in 2003 by Lionel Fretz and James Cameron to support efforts to develop solutions to climate change and resource depletion. Fretz left Climate Change Capital at the end of 2004 to found rival carbon trading company, called Carbon Capital Markets, backed by the AIM listed fund Trading Emissions PLC. Shortly, after Mark Woodall became the first CEO of Climate Change Capital.

History
Climate Change Capital established an advisory group in 2004 to provide financial, strategic and policy advice to energy-intensive industries, financial institutions, cleantech companies and governments.

The asset management business, which was established in 2005, included a carbon finance fund that invests in emission reduction projects, predominantly in developing countries, a private equity fund that invests in late stage technology and services companies headquartered in Europe and a property fund that buys commercial green buildings or retrofits existing commercial properties in the United Kingdom..

The company's think tank was established in 2009 to promote discussion of how capital can be deployed to mitigate and adapt to climate change.

The company employed a large number of leading climate change experts, among them Paul Bodnar who subsequently went on to the Obama White House to serve as Special Assistant to the President and Senior Director for Energy and Climate Change at the National Security Council and from 2018 went on to lead the Rocky Mountain Institute. 

In 2006, the group launched the world's largest private sector carbon fund.

Acquisition

In April 2012, Bunge Ltd, a global agribusiness and food company founded in 1818, acquired Climate Change Capital Group Limited.

In 2015, Bunge Limited decided to close Climate Change Capital as part of a wider shutdown of its asset management activities.

Climate Change Capital’s chairman was James Cameron, a member of General Electric's ecomagination board, a trustee member of the UK Green Building Council and the Carbon Disclosure Project.  Climate Change Capital's CEO at the time it was closed was Eric Alsembach, who also served as the managing director of the Bunge Asset Management group.

References

External links
Climate Change Capital (Company Website)

Rocky Mountain Institute - Paul Bodnar

Investment management companies of the United Kingdom

Carbon finance